Lucia Rosa was a girl from the 19th century who wanted to marry a poor farmer and instead was forced by her father to marry a wealthy man she did not want. In despair, she threw herself into the Tyrrhenian Sea on the northwest side of the island of Ponza, Italy. She is viewed by some women as a martyr for women's rights and a symbol for human rights. A beach and a group of tall rock stacks (the 'faraglioni di Lucia Rossa') are named after her, at the place where she died.

References

External links 
Lucia Rosa Stacks Google Maps
Picture and description of Lucia Rosa beach

Italian children
People from the Province of Latina
Suicides by drowning
19th-century deaths
Suicides in Italy
Year of birth unknown